Mont Noir (Zwarte Berg in Dutch) is a  high hill located on the French-Belgian border, a few kilometres from Bailleul. It takes its name from the presence of a high concentration of black pine woodland, which covers the hillside.

Location
Three municipalities share Mont Noir; Saint-Jans-Cappel and Boeschepe, both in France, and Westouter in Belgium. The summit is located entirely in France.

References

External links 
 MONT NOIR MILITARY CEMETERY, ST. JANS-CAPPEL, cwgc.org

Landforms of Nord (French department)
Noir
Hauts-de-France region articles needing translation from French Wikipedia